The Tongan castaways were a group of six Tongan teenage boys who shipwrecked on the uninhabited island of Ata in 1965 and lived there for 15 months until their rescue. The boys ran away from their boarding school on the island of Tongatapu, stealing a boat in their escape. After a storm wrecked the boat, they drifted to the abandoned, remote island of Ata. Long thought dead, they were discovered and rescued in September 1966 by Australian lobster fisher.

Escape
The six boys were aged between 15 and 17: Luke Veikoso, Fatai Latu, Sione Fataua, Tevita Siola'a, Kolo Fekitoa, and Mano Totau. In June 1965 the boys ran away from their strict Catholic boarding school, St. Andrew's College, in Nukualofa on Tongatapu. They had stolen a  boat on short notice and with little preparation. The boat's sail and rudder were destroyed quickly by the wild winds. Over the next eight days, they drifted for almost  generally southwest, bailing water from their disintegrating boat until they sighted Ata; at that point, they abandoned their ship and swam to shore over the next 36 hours, using planks salvaged from the wreck.

Cast away
Mano was the first to reach land; weak from hunger and dehydration, he could not stand but called out that he had safely reached shore, and the rest followed him. After escaping the sea, the boys dug a cave by hand and hunted seabirds for meat, blood, and eggs.

Initially, they were desperate for food and water, but their situation improved after three months when they discovered the ruins of the village of Kolomaile in the island's volcanic crater, following a two-day climb. They revived the remnants of 19th century habitation, surviving on feral chickens, wild taro, and bananas; they captured rainwater for drinking in hollowed-out tree trunks.They drank blood from seabirds when they did not have enough water. The boys divided up the labour, teaming up in pairs to work garden, kitchen, and guard duty. The two eldest served as leaders: one spiritual, the other practical; Stephen (who would go on to become an engineer) managed to start a fire using two sticks, which the boys kept burning continuously for more than a year while marooned.

At night, they sang and played a makeshift guitar to keep their spirits up, composing five songs during their exile. The breakup of their raft was fortunate in retrospect, as the boys believed they were in Samoa and had started sailing south into the open ocean.

Rescue
On 11 September 1966, the Australian fishing boat Just David, captained by Peter Warner, approached Ata after Warner noticed patches of burned grass on the island's cliffsides. Warner, moonlighting as a fisherman operating out of Tasmania, was sailing near Ata while returning home.

After spotting the unkempt, naked boys through binoculars, Just David approached cautiously, as Warner had been told that serious criminals were sometimes marooned on remote islands. When the ship was close enough, Stephen dove in and swam to the boat, explaining himself in English.

To verify their story, Warner radioed their names to Nukualofa and after a 20-minute wait, was told, "You found them! These boys have been given up for dead. Funerals have been held. If it's them, this is a miracle!"

Aftermath
Upon later examination, all six boys were healthy.

After an enormous celebration, the group was hired by Warner to crew a lobster boat. During the feasts, the families of the castaway boys promised to teach Warner the secrets of how and where to fish for the Pacific spiny lobster, and Warner was given a royal concession to trap the spiny lobster in Tongan waters as a reward for rescuing the group, befriending King Tāufaāhau Tupou IV.

Warner learned the boys had been incarcerated for theft when they did not show up to a party he was holding to honour them. Warner then arranged with Channel 7 in Sydney to film their story; he used  (USD $203) from the sale of the rights to compensate the stolen boat's owner for its loss, and in return, the owner dropped the charges.

The Channel 7 television crew sailed with Warner and the boys back to Ata to film a re-enactment of their story, The Castaways, which was broadcast in October 1966. Only one copy of the 1966 documentary survives today; it is available on YouTube.

Later documentaries and books
In 2015 Spanish explorer Alvaro Cerezo spent 10 days on Ata island with Kolo Fekitoa, one of the castaways (by then in his mid-60s). The two men lived there alone and survived on coconuts, fish, and seabirds, exactly as the boys did back in 1965. In summer 2020, Cerezo released a documentary of his experience with Kolo and a book detailing the 15-month ordeal of the castaways.
A trailer for the documentary was published on YouTube.

In 2020, historian Rutger Bregman wrote about the castaways' civilized experiences in his book Humankind: A Hopeful History, as a rebuttal example to the fictional story, The Lord of the Flies, where a group of castaway boys on a deserted island descended into savagery. In addition, the film studio New Regency acquired the film rights for the boys' experience for a possible feature film.

References

External links
 . The Castaways (1966), documentary from ATN-7
 .
 , a 2021 recapitulation

History of Tonga
Castaways